Eupithecia atomaria is a moth in the  family Geometridae. It is found in Ivory Coast, Kenya and South Africa.

References

Moths described in 1902
atomaria
Moths of Africa